Aethelstan was a medieval Bishop of Ramsbury.

Aethelstan was consecrated around 909. He died between 909 and 927.

Citations

References

External links
 

Bishops of Ramsbury (ancient)
10th-century deaths
Year of birth unknown
10th-century English bishops